Philip Ewing Boyd (June 5, 1876 – November 16, 1967) was an Olympic rower who won a silver medal for Canada in the 1904 Summer Olympics.

References

External links
Phil Boyd's profile at databaseOlympics
Phil Boyd's profile at Sports Reference.com

1876 births
1967 deaths
Canadian male rowers
Medalists at the 1904 Summer Olympics
Olympic rowers of Canada
Rowers at the 1904 Summer Olympics
Rowers at the 1912 Summer Olympics
Olympic silver medalists for Canada
Olympic medalists in rowing